The Battle of Jamrud was fought between the Emirate of Afghanistan under Emir Dost Mohammad Khan and the Sikh Empire under Maharaja Ranjit Singh on 30 April 1837. Afghan forces confronted the Sikh forces at Jamrud. The garrisoned army was able to hold off the Afghans till Sikh reinforcements arrived to relieve them.

Background
Following the consolidation of the Sikh Empire in Punjab, Maharaja Ranjit Singh had led a wave of invasions on Afghan-held territories, also capitalizing off of Afghan Civil war and began conquering the long-held Afghan territories over the preceding years. This resulted in the Durrani Empire losing the Punjab region, Multan, Kashmir, Derajat, Hazara, Balakot and Attock, whereas Peshawar and Jamrud would later be seized from the Peshawar Sardars in the Battle of Peshawar (1834)

Prelude and battle
Towards the end of 1836, Sardar Hari Singh Nalwa attacked and captured the small, but very strategic, fortified Khyberi village of Jamrud, situated on the south-side of a range of mountains at the mouth of the Khyber Pass. With the conquest of Jamrud, the frontier of the Sikh Empire now bordered the frontier of Afghanistan.
In 1837, the Sikh Army was in Lahore where all best generals and troops were recalled from all places including Peshawar for the wedding of Kanwar Nau Nihal Singh, the grandson of Maharaja Ranjit Singh. The Emir of Afghanistan, Dost Mohammad Khan, finding this as the right opportunity, sent his sons with a 7000 cavalry, 2000 matchlockmen, 9000 guerilla fighters and 20,000 Khybers, to drive the Sikhs out of Peshawar. Akbar Khan reached Jamrud, and saw no sign of the Sikh forces, and as a result began to demolish the defenses of the fort. While Akbar Khan's forces were focused on destroying the fortifications, Hari Singh Nawla, the Sikh general, led a charge against the Afghans. The Afghans were sent into disarray with heavy losses, and Akbar Khan's force was relieved by Shams al-Din Khan, who charged the Sikh lines. Akbar Khan reorganized and rallied his men and forced the Sikhs to retreat to the fort of Jamrud. Amidst the fighting, the Sikh general, Sardar Hari Singh Nalwa was mortally injured in the battle and later died after forcing his way into the fort. According to Afghan chronicle Siraj al-Tawarikh, Akbar Khan and Hari Singh Nawla engaged in a duel without recognizing each other. After much thrusting and parrying, Akbar Khan won out and Hari Singh Nawla was knocked to the ground and killed. According to historian Hari Ram Gupta, when Hari Singh rallied his men and rode to the front, he was struck by two bullets, one in the stomach and the other on the side. Mortally wounded he was immediately taken inside the fort where he said to keep his death a secret till the reinforcements arrived. Many eyewitnesses claimed Nalwa ordered his dead body to be hung outside the fort before he died, discouraging the Afghans from attacking, believing Nalwa was still alive. Nevertheless, the Sikh garrison continued holding out until Sikh reinforcements arrived from Lahore, prompting the Afghans to retire from the siege. The battle ended with  the retreat of Afghans back to Jalalabad.

Result of the battle
The result of the battle is disputed amongst historians. Some contend the failure of the Afghans to take the fort and the city of Peshawar or town of Jamrud as a victory for the Sikhs. On the other hand, some state that the killing of Hari Singh Nalwa resulted in an Afghan victory. James Norris, Professor of Political Science at Texas A&M International University, states that the battle's outcome was inconclusive.

See also
Battle of Attock
Battle of Multan
Battle of Shopian
Battle of Nowshera
Battle of Peshawar (1834)

References
 

Conflicts in 1837
Battles involving Afghanistan
Battles involving the Sikhs
1837 in Asia
Ranjit Singh
April 1837 events